Großbreitenbach is a town in the Ilm-Kreis district, in Thuringia, Germany. It is situated 13 km southeast of Ilmenau. It has about 8000 inhabitants. Major industries are glass manufacturing and tourism. The former municipalities Altenfeld, Böhlen, Friedersdorf, Gillersdorf, Herschdorf, Neustadt am Rennsteig and Wildenspring were merged into Großbreitenbach in January 2019.

Großbreitenbach has a big public swimming pool, which has the biggest bathing area in the Ilm-Kreis district.

References

Towns in Thuringia
Ilm-Kreis